Josh Jauncey (born February 10, 1993) is a Canadian kickboxer who competes in the Glory Lightweight division.

He was ranked in the Combat Press Lightweight top ten between October 2015 and December 2016.

Career
Jauncey made his Glory debut during Glory 16, when he was scheduled to fight Warren Stevelmans. The fight went into an extra round, after which Jauncey won a decision.

Jauncey fought Jae Gil Noh during Glory 18, which he won by a second round KO.

He was scheduled to fight Max Baumert during Glory 19. Josh won the fight by a third round TKO.

Jauncey participated in the 2015 Lightweight Contender Tournament. He defeated Djime Coulibaly by TKO, at the tail end of the second round. He met Sitthichai Sitsongpeenong in the finals, and lost by unanimous decision.

After losing the tournament finals, Jauncey was scheduled to fight the pound for pound great Giorgio Petrosyan. He lost the fight by unanimous decision.

Jauncey then went on a 6-3 run, ending on a three fight winning streak, capped off with a split decision win over Christian Baya. His three fight winning streak earned him a chance to rematch Sitthichai Sitsongpeenong for the Glory Lightweight Championship. Sitthichai once again won the fight by unanimous decision.

After his failed title bid, Jauncey lost his next fight to Tyjani Beztati by decision as well. In his next two fights, Jauncey was scheduled to fight Lorawnt Nelson and Stoyan Koprivlenski, both of which he won by decision.

Jauncey was booked to challenge the reigning Glory Lightweight champion Tyjani Beztati at Glory 80 Studio on May 14, 2022.

Titles and achievements
Amateur
 WKL Super Welterweight North American Champion
 WKL Super Welterweight Pacific Northwest Champion
 TBA-SK Super Welterweight Pacific Northwest Champion
 CMTA Jr British Columbia Champion
 CMTA Jr Canadian Champion
 GG Promotions Junior World Champion

Kickboxing record

|- style="background:#fbb;"
| 2022-05-14 || Loss ||align=left| Tyjani Beztati || Glory 80 Studio || Netherlands || KO (Left hook)|| 2 || 
|-
! style=background:white colspan=9 |
|-  style="text-align:center; background:#CCFFCC;"
| 2019-11-07 || Win ||align=left| Stoyan Koprivlenski || Glory 73: Shenzhen || Shenzhen, China || Decision (Split) || 3 || 3:00
|-  style="text-align:center; background:#CCFFCC"
| 2019-09-28 || Win ||align=left| Lorawnt Nelson || Glory 68: Miami || Miami, United States  || Decision (Unanimous) || 3 || 3:00
|- align="center" bgcolor= "#FFBBBB"
| 2019-05-17|| Loss ||align=left| Tyjani Beztati || Glory 65: Utrecht || Utrecht, Netherlands || Decision (Unanimous) || 3 || 3:00
|-  style="text-align:center; background:#FFBBBB;"
| 2018-11-02 || Loss ||align=left| Sitthichai Sitsongpeenong || Glory 61: New York || New York, United States || Decision (Unanimous) || 5 || 3:00
|-
! style=background:white colspan=9 |
|-  style="text-align:center; background:#CCFFCC"
| 2018-06-02 || Win ||align=left| Christian Baya || Glory 54: Birmingham || Birmingham, England  || Decision (Split) || 3 || 3:00
|-  style="text-align:center; background:#CCFFCC"
| 2018-03-31 || Win ||align=left| Stoyan Koprivlenski || Glory 52: Los Angeles || Los Angeles, United States || Decision (Split) || 3 || 3:00
|-  style="text-align:center; background:#cfc;"
| 2017-12-09 || Win ||align=left| Stephen Oppomg || PKL Kickboxing 1 || Fredericton, Canada || Decision (Split) || 3 || 3:00
|-  style="text-align:center; background:#FFBBBB;"
| 2017-07-14 || Loss ||align=left| Elvis Gashi || Glory 43: New York || New York City, New York, USA || TKO (punches)|| 2 || 2:59
|-  style="text-align:center; background:#CCFFCC"
| 2017-04-29 || Win||align=left| Antonio Gomez || Glory 40: Copenhagen || Copenhagen, Denmark || TKO (Doctor Stoppage) || 2 ||
|-  style="text-align:center; background:#FFBBBB;"
| 2016-11-05 || Loss ||align=left| Christian Baya || Glory 35: Nice || Nice, France || Decision (Majority) || 3 || 3:00
|-  style="text-align:center; background:#FFBBBB;"
| 2016-06-25|| Loss ||align=left|  Anatoly Moiseev || Glory 31: Amsterdam || Amsterdam, Netherlands || Decision (Unanimous) || 3 || 3:00
|-  style="text-align:center; background:#CCFFCC"
| 2016-04-02 || Win ||align=left| Xu Yan || Glory of Heroes 1 || Shenzhen, China || KO (Head Kick) || 3 || 0:34
|-  style="text-align:center; background:#CCFFCC"
| 2016-03-12 || Win ||align=left| Johan Tkac || Glory 28: Paris || Paris, France || TKO (Doctor Stoppage) || 2 || 3:00
|-  style="text-align:center; background:#FFBBBB;"
| 2015-11-06 || Loss ||align=left| Giorgio Petrosyan || Glory 25: Milan || Monza, Italy || Decision (unanimous) || 3 || 3:00
|-  style="text-align:center; background:#FFBBBB;"
| 2015-06-05 || Loss ||align=left| Sitthichai Sitsongpeenong || Glory 22: Lille Lightweight Contender Tournament, Final|| Lille, France || Decision (unanimous) || 3 || 3:00
|-  style="text-align:center; background:#CCFFCC"
| 2015-06-05 || Win ||align=left| Djime Coulibaly || Glory 22: Lille Lightweight Contender Tournament, Semi Finals|| Lille, France || TKO (2 knockdowns rule) || 3 || 2:59
|-  style="text-align:center; background:#cfc;"
| 2015-02-06 || Win ||align=left| Max Baumert || Glory 19: Virginia || Hampton, Virginia, USA || TKO (Doctor Stoppage) || 3 || 0:37
|-  style="text-align:center; background:#CCFFCC"
| 2014-11-07 || Win||align=left| Jae Gil Noh || Glory 18: Oklahoma || Oklahoma City, Oklahoma, USA || KO (Punches & knee) || 2 || 1:14
|-  style="text-align:center; background:#CCFFCC"
| 2014-05-03 || Win ||align=left| Warren Stevelmans || Glory 16: Denver || Broomfield, Colorado, US || Ext.R Decision (unanimous) || 4 || 3:00
|-  style="text-align:center; background:#FFBBBB;"
| 2013-11-15 || Loss ||align=left| Hinata || Shoot Boxing Battle Summit Ground Zero Tokyo 2013 || Tokyo, Japan || Decision (unanimous) || 3 || 3:00
|-  style="text-align:center; background:#CCFFCC"
| 2013-07-13 || Win ||align=left| David Calvo || Enfusion Live || Spain ||  TKO ||  ||
|-  style="text-align:center; background:#CCFFCC"
| 2013-05-11 || Win ||align=left| Stanislav Kazantciev || Kickboxgala || Netherlands ||  Decision  || 3 || 3:00
|-
| colspan=9 | Legend:    

|-
|-
|-  style="background:#CCFFCC"
| 2012-09-29 || Win ||align=left| Roy Corona || SEPTEMBER STORM! || Vancouver, Canada || TKO (Leg Kick) || 2 ||
|-
! style=background:white colspan=9 |
|-  style="background:#CCFFCC"
| 2012-03-31 || Win ||align=left| Jason Hinds || NAC 27 || Vancouver, Canada || Decision (Unanimous) || 3 || 3:00  
|-
! style=background:white colspan=9 |
|-  style="background:#fbb;"
| 2011-12-03|| Loss||align=left| Hakeem Dawodu || K-1 Last Man Standing 8-man Tournament, Semi Final || Victoria, British Columbia, Canada || Decision (Majority) || 3 || 2:00
|-  style="background:#cfc;"
| 2011-12-03|| Win||align=left|  || K-1 Last Man Standing 8-man Tournament, Quarter Final || Victoria, British Columbia, Canada || ||  ||
|-  style="background:#CCFFCC"
| 2011-10-21 || Win ||align=left| Chris Ferguson || North American Challenge 26 || Vancouver, Canada || TKO (Retirement) || 1 ||
|-  style="background:#CCFFCC"
| 2011-09-30 || Win ||align=left| Ruel Copeland || Fight at The View VII || Vancouver, Canada || Decision (Unanimous) || 3 || 3:00
|-  style="background:#CCFFCC"
| 2011-02-25 || Win ||align=left| Guillermo Valpoort || Fight at The View V || Vancouver, Canada || TKO (Spinning Back Kick) || 2 || 0:53
|-
! style=background:white colspan=9 |
|-  style="background:#CCFFCC"
| 2010-11-27 || Win ||align=left| Jason Szeakeal || Fight at The View IV || Vancouver, Canada || Decision (Unanimous) || 4 || 3:00  
|-
! style=background:white colspan=9 |
|-

Professional boxing record

|-
|1
|Win
|1–0
|style="text-align:left;"| Brian Samuel
|
|4 (4), 
|3:00
|30 April 2021
|style="text-align:left;"| 
|
|-
| colspan=10 | Legend:

See also
List of male kickboxers

References

1993 births
Living people
Canadian male kickboxers
Lightweight kickboxers
Glory kickboxers
Sportspeople from London